Ponthieva racemosa, commonly called the hairy shadow witch or racemose ponthieva, is a species of orchid found from the southeastern United States (from Texas to Virginia), Mexico, Central America, the West Indies and northern South America as far south as Bolivia.

References

External links
IOSPE orchid photos
Line Drawing - Flora of Panama, Ponthieva racemosa
Florida Native Orchids, Shadow Witch Orchid (Ponthieva racemosa)
Go Orchids, North American Orchid Conservation Center,  Ponthieva racemosa (Walter) C. Mohr Hairy, Shadow Witch
Ricardo's Blog, orchids, parrots, fish and people, Ponthieva racemosa, the shadow witch, an orchid native of Puerto Rico 
Wildflowers of the United States, Shadow Witch Orchid, Hairy Shadow Witch, Racemose Ponthieva - Ponthieva racemosa

racemosa
Orchids of North America
Orchids of Central America
Orchids of South America
Plants described in 1788